Israel Raymundo Gallardo Sevilla (born 30 November 1971) is a Mexican politician affiliated with the National Action Party. As of 2014 he served as Deputy of the LIX Legislature of the Mexican Congress representing Puebla.

References

1971 births
Living people
Politicians from the State of Mexico
National Action Party (Mexico) politicians
21st-century Mexican politicians
Deputies of the LIX Legislature of Mexico
Members of the Chamber of Deputies (Mexico) for Puebla